Hide is an album by experimental artist Foetus,  released on CD by Ectopic Ents on September 29, 2010.  Initial copies included a 5″ x 5″ sticker of the front cover, signed by J. G. Thirlwell.

Track listing
All songs by J. G. Thirlwell
"Cosmetics" – 8:39
"Paper Slippers" – 5:33
"Stood Up" – 4:19
"Here Comes the Rain" – 4:34
"Oilfields" – 6:41
"Concrete" – 2:35
"The Ballad of Sisyphus T. Jones" – 5:56
"Fortitudine Vincemus" – 0:47
"You're Trying to Break Me" – 8:32
"O Putrid Sun (for Yuko)" – 3:10

Personnel
J. G. Thirlwell – All instruments and vocals, except:
Abby Fischer – Vocals on tracks 1, 5, 7, 8
Steven Bernstein – Trumpet, alto horn on 2, 3, 7
Leyna Marika Papach – Violin on 3, 7, 10
Elliot Hoffman – Drums on 1
Ed Pastorini – Piano on 10
Jeff Davidson – Drums on 10
Christian Gibbs – Guitar on 7

Production
J. G. Thirlwell – Production, composition, arrangements, recording, mixing, sleeve design
Heung-Heung Chin – Art direction

References

External links
Hide at foetus.org

2010 albums
Foetus (band) albums
Albums produced by JG Thirlwell